HMS Jutland (D62) was a later or 1943  fleet destroyer of the United Kingdom's Royal Navy. She was named after the Battle of Jutland, the largest naval battle of the First World War. The first Jutland was launched in 1945, but was cancelled that same year. Her sister ship, Malplaquet - named after a battle between Britain and France during the War of the Spanish Succession in 1709 - was renamed Jutland just prior to her launch on 20 February 1946, and was commissioned on 30 July 1947. The original Jutland was finally broken up in 1957 at Rosyth.

Service
After the group's visit to South Africa, they performed a number of naval exercises before returning to the UK in December.

In April 1950 Jutland was temporarily laid-up, but the following year she returned to active service, seeing service with the Home and Mediterranean Fleets. In 1952, as part of the 4th Destroyer Squadron, Jutland visited the Middle East, during the troubles in Egypt. In 1953 she took part in the Fleet Review to celebrate the Coronation of Queen Elizabeth II and was subsequently placed in Reserve, along with a number of her sister ships. In 1957, Jutland joined the Home and subsequently the Mediterranean Fleets as part of the 7th Destroyer Squadron. The following year, during a daytime exercise off Malta, Jutland collided with her sister ship , causing minor damage.

Decommissioning and disposal
In 1961 Jutland was placed in reserve. She was subsequently placed on the disposal list and broken up at Faslane in 1965.

References

Publications
 
 

 

Battle-class destroyers of the Royal Navy
Ships built on the River Clyde
1946 ships
Cold War destroyers of the United Kingdom